Brian Thompson is an American actor.

Brian Thompson may also refer to:

Brian B. Thompson, British writer
Brian Thompson (footballer, born 1938) (1938–2011), English professional footballer and concert promoter
Brian Thompson (footballer, born 1950), English professional footballer
Brian Thompson (footballer, born 1952), English professional footballer
Brian Thompson (sailor) (born 1962), British sailor

See also
Bryan Thompson (disambiguation)
Brian Thomson (disambiguation)
Brian Thomsen (1959–2008), science fiction editor, author, and anthologist